Loris Vergier (born 7 May 1996) is a French downhill mountain bike rider. As a Junior, he won first place at the 2014 UCI Downhill Mountain World Championships.

Career
Vergier began racing for Lapierre Bikes as a junior in 2013. The following year he won both the Junior world cup overall as well as the Junior World Championships in Hafjell, Norway. In 2015, he moved up to the elite category and took third place at the UCI world cup round in Windham, U.S.

In 2016 the Lapierre team switched to specialized bikes. Vergier finished the UCI World Cup season in seventh place. His best result of the 2016 season was a second place in Leogang, Switzerland.

The following year, he left the team to join Greg Minnaar and Luca Shaw at the Santa Cruz Syndicate after Steve Peat announced his retirement from professional downhill racing and Josh Bryceland announced that he would no longer be racing for the syndicate.

In 2021 Loris joined the Trek factory Racing team.

References

Living people
Downhill mountain bikers
1996 births
People from Cagnes-sur-Mer
Sportspeople from Alpes-Maritimes
Cyclists from Provence-Alpes-Côte d'Azur